Lucien Keith (March 31, 1860 – March 16, 1933) was an American Democratic politician who served as a member of the Virginia Senate from 1918 to 1920.

His grandfather, Isham Keith (1801–1863), served as a member of the Virginia House of Delegates in 1843.

References

External links
 
 

1860 births
1933 deaths
Democratic Party Virginia state senators
People from Fauquier County, Virginia
University of Virginia alumni
20th-century American politicians